Clayoqua Indian Reserve 6 or Clayoqua 6 is an Indian Reserve in the Clayoquot Sound region of the West Coast of Vancouver Island of British Columbia, Canada.

See also
List of Indian reserves in British Columbia
Clayoquot (disambiguation)

References

Indian reserves in British Columbia
West Coast of Vancouver Island
Nuu-chah-nulth